Niels P. Larsen was a member of the Wisconsin State Assembly.

Biography
A Danish emigrant, Larsen was born on June 4, 1853. He moved with his parents to New Denmark, Wisconsin in 1861. In 1918, he moved to Denmark, Wisconsin.

Career
Larsen was elected to the Assembly in 1918. He was a Republican.

References

Danish emigrants to the United States
Republican Party members of the Wisconsin State Assembly
1853 births
Year of death missing
People from Denmark, Wisconsin
People from New Denmark, Wisconsin
Leaders of the American Society of Equity